Critter Creek Farm Sanctuary is an American nonprofit 501(c)(3) animal protection organization located in Gainesville, Florida. It is America's largest shelter for farmed bovines, with 98 cows as of October 2020. The sanctuary was founded by Dr. Erin Amerman and her husband Dr. Chris Amerman in 2016. Critter Creek Farm Sanctuary's mission is to promote compassion for farmed animals through rescue and education.

History 
Critter Creek Farm Sanctuary was founded on a 200-acre property in 2016 in Gainesville, Florida. The original Critter Creek property comprises a 125-acre wildlife preserve and a 75-acre sanctuary. In 2019, the Amermans expanded the sanctuary with the purchase of “Critter Hills,” a 205-acre former cattle ranch. Amerman, an author of human anatomy and physiology textbooks, cites a lifelong love of animals as inspiring her to start a sanctuary.

The sanctuary 
Critter Creek Farm Sanctuary has two facilities totaling 415 acres. As of October 2020, it is home to 98 cows, 19 pigs, 11 horses, nine donkeys, three turkeys, and a water buffalo. The animals housed at the sanctuary were injured, neglected, abused, or at imminent risk of slaughter.

Education is a key part of the sanctuary's mission. In pursuit of that mission, it hosts open houses, tours, and vegan farmers markets to facilitate interaction with the animals. According to Amerman, the aim of these events is to help people see farmed animals in a different light.

Notable sanctuary residents include Seymour the water buffalo, Eli the calf, and Marley the piglet. The duo of Eli and Marley were transported together to the sanctuary; during the trip, they formed a friendship. This friendship was featured in an episode of Comeback Kids by The Dodo. The story of Eli and Marley was ranked as number six in the top 10 animal stories of 2020 by the website One Green Planet. In April 2021, Buddy the Beefalo, an animal who escaped a slaughterhouse in Connecticut, was captured by Plymouth police captain Ed Benecchi and transported to Critter Creek Farm Sanctuary.

Rescue collaborations 
Critter Creek Farm Sanctuary frequently collaborates with other rescue organizations, including the SPCA and The Humane Society. In April 2020, it partnered with Farm Sanctuary, the Animal Legal Defense Fund, and five Florida sanctuaries to rescue over 100 animals from an illegal slaughterhouse in Fort Myers, Florida.  Also in April 2020, Critter Creek Farm Sanctuary rented a truck and delivered donated produce to rescue organizations harmed financially by the COVID-19 pandemic.

See also 

 Animal welfare
 Animal rights
 The Humane Society of the United States
 List of animal sanctuaries

References

External links 

 

Animal sanctuaries
501(c)(3) organizations
Animal rights organizations
Animal welfare organizations based in the United States
Animal welfare
Vegan organizations